The men's 110 metres hurdles event at the 1965 Summer Universiade was held at the People's Stadium in Budapest on 28 and 29 August 1965.

Medalists

Results

Heats
Wind:Heat 1: ? m/s, Heat 2: +2.1 m/s

Final

Wind: +0.6 m/s

References

Athletics at the 1965 Summer Universiade
1965